Lancashire, like all other counties of England, has historically had its own peculiar superstitions, manners, and customs, which may or may not find parallels in those of other localities. The following list of folklore of Lancashire was collected in 1851 by one Tattersall Wilkinson of Burnley, as exemplars of the time:

 If a person's hair, when thrown into the fire, burns brightly, it is a sure sign that the individual will live long. The brighter the flame the longer life, and vice versa.
 A young person frequently stirs the fire with the poker to test the humour of a lover. If the fire blaze brightly, the lover is good-humoured; and vice versa.
 A crooked sixpence, or a copper coin with a hole through, are accounted lucky coins.
 Cutting or paring the nails of the hands or feet on a Friday or Sunday, is very unlucky.
 If a person's left ear burns, or feels hot, somebody is praising the party; if the right ear burns, then it is a sure sign that some one is speaking evil of the person.
 Children are frequently cautioned by their parents not to walk backwards when going an errand; it is a sure sign that they will be unfortunate in their objects.
 A horseshoe is still nailed behind many doors to counteract the effects of witchcraft: a hagstone with a hole through, tied to the key of the stable-door, protects the horses, and, if hung up at the bed's head, the farmer also.
 A hot iron put into the cream during the process of churning, expels the witch from the churn; and dough in preparation for the baker is protected by being marked with the figure of a cross.
 Warts are cured by being rubbed over with a black snail, but the snail must afterwards be impaled upon a hawthorn. If a bag containing as many small pebbles as a person has warts, be tossed over the left shoulder, it will transfer the warts to whoever is unfortunate enough to pick up the bag.
 If black snails are seized by the horn and tossed over the left shoulder, the process will insure good luck to the person who performs it.
 Profuse bleeding is said to be instantly stopped by certain persons who pretend to possess the secret of a certain form of words which immediately act as a charm.
 The power of bewitching, producing evil to parties by wishing it, &c., is supposed to be transmitted from one possessor to another when one of the parties is about to die. The writer is in possession of full particulars respecting this supposed transfer.
 Cramp is effectually prevented by placing the shoes with the toes just peeping from beneath the coverlet; the same is also prevented by tying the garter round the left leg below the knee.
 Charmed rings are worn by many for the cure of dyspepsia; and so also are charmed belts for the cure of rheumatism.
 A red-haired person is supposed to bring in ill-luck if he be the first to enter a house on New Year's Day. Black-haired persons are rewarded with liquor and small gratuities for "taking in the new year" to the principal houses in their respective neighbourhoods.
 If any householder's fire does not burn through the night of New Year's Eve, it betokens bad luck during the ensuing year; and if any party allow another a live coal, or even a lighted candle, on such an occasion, the bad luck is extended to the other part for commiserating with the former in his misfortunes.

See also
English folklore

References

Lancashire folklore